Demi Lambourne (born 30 April 1996) is an English football goalkeeper who plays for Leicester City of the FA Women's Super League.

Lambourne is from Oxford and began playing for Oxford United's centre of excellence. In the 2014 FA WSL season Oxford joined the inaugural FA WSL 2 and Lambourne made 18 appearances in her first season in senior football, following an injury to the club's regular goalkeeper Hannah Cox.

In 2015 Lambourne established herself as Oxford's recognised first-choice goalkeeper, and signed a new contract with the club. She was also called into the England women's national under-19 football team.

Lambourne signed for Leicester City in August 2018. She made her FA WSL debut in November 2021, in a 1–0 defeat by Everton at Pirelli Stadium.

References

External links

1996 births
Women's association football goalkeepers
Women's Super League players
English women's footballers
Oxford United W.F.C. players
Footballers from Oxford
Living people
Leicester City W.F.C. players
Women's Championship (England) players